Ginevra Cantofoli (1618–1672) was an Italian painter. She was active in Bologna in the Baroque period.

Career
Cantofoli was born in Bologna, Italy in 1618. She trained under Giovanni Andrea Sirani, the father of Elisabetta Sirani, in Bologna. Although a generation older than Elisabetta Sirani, Cantofoli was described by Carlo Cesare Malvasia, and Marcello Oretti as Elisabetta's student. Also named as her teachers are Emilio Taruffi, Lorenzo Pasinelli, and Giovanni Gioseffo dal Sole.

According to art historian Laura M. Ragg, among the women painters in Bologna at the time, Cantofoli "had much more talent than any of her companions."

Her early works were pastel portraits and small paintings, but she later went on to paint large-scale compositions. She was primarily a history painter. She also produced several altarpieces for Bolognese churches, although none of these works are known to still exist.

Art historian Massimo Pulini attributes 30 works to Cantofoli. Among her works are a painting, Self-Portrait, Painting the Madonna of St Luke, and a drawing, Self-Portrait, which portrays the artist holding a palette and brushes before an easel, both dated to c. 1665. It has also been asserted that a painting known as Allegory of Painting (in a private collection) contains a self-portrait, and that "the features of many of her female figures resemble her own."

A painting of a woman in a turban in the collection of the Palazzo Barberini, traditionally identified as a portrait of Beatrice Cenci, long attributed to Guido Reni, has been attributed to Ginevra Cantofoli.

At auction
A record price for a work by Cantofoli was set by "A Sea-Nymph, probably Galatea," auctioned for $137,500 at Sotheby's, New York, January 30, 2020.

Gallery

References and footnotes

Sources
 Bohn, Babette. "Female Self-Portraiture in Early Modern Bologna", Renaissance Studies, Vol. 18, No. 2 (June 2004), pp. 239–286   
 Bryan, Michael. "Cantofoli, Ginevra" in Bryan's Dictionary of Painters and Engravers, Biographical and Critical, London: George Bell and Sons, 1899, Vol. I: (A-K), p. 227.
 Pulini, Massimo (2006). Ginevra Cantofoli: la nuova nascita di una pittrice nella Bologna del Seicento, Bologna 2006.
 Ragg, Laura M. The Women Artists of Bologna, London: Methuen & Co., 1907.

Further reading
 Bohn, Babette. Women Artists, Their Patrons, and Their Publics in Early Modern Bologna, Penn State University Press, 2021.
 Graziani, Irene (2008). "Ginevra Cantofoli, Madonna col Bambino, no. 268," in Pinacoteca Nazionale di Bologna. Catalogo generale, vol. 3, Guido Reni e il Seicento, Venice: Marsilio, 2008, pp. 450–451.
 Graziani, Irene (2014). "Ginevra Cantofoli, Sibyl of Eritrea," in  Angelo Mazza, ed., Antico e Moderno. Acquisizioni e donazioni per la storia di Bologna (2001-2013), catalogue for the exhibition in Bologna, Palazzo Fava, 27 June-28 September 2014, Bologna: Bononia University Press, 2014, pp. 94–95.
 Italian Cultural Institute, London. Diacromie. Dialogie e Derive. Collezione Koelliker, catalogue of exhibition 19 October-29 November 2006, n.p. (Sea-Nymph reproduced in color).
 Pulini, Massimo (2004a). "1656. Ritratto di Ginevra Cantofoli pittrice," in J. Bentini and V. Fortunati, eds., Elisabetta Sirani "pittrice eroina" 1638-1665, exhibition catalogue, Bologna 2004, pp. 134–141.
 Pulini, Massimo (2004b). "Un'altra donna pittrice nel Seicento," in Avvenire, December 19, 2004, p. 22.

External links
 The Mystery of Ginevra Cantofoli by Amanda Hickey; includes a comment thread by Alan Templeton.

1618 births
1672 deaths
Painters from Bologna
17th-century Italian painters
Italian women painters
17th-century Italian women artists